Jamsil Middle School is a middle school located in Jamsil-dong, Songpa-gu, Seoul, South Korea. It was founded in January 1980 (hangul: 잠실중학교; hanja: 蠶室中學校).

External links
 Jamsil middle school Homepage - Korean language version only.

Education in Seoul
Middle schools in South Korea
Educational institutions established in 1980
Songpa District